The following is a list of men's basketball players that have played in a Serbia-based club before the NBA draft. The list has not included Serbian players selected in the draft while playing for a club based outside Serbia.

The National Basketball Association (NBA) holds an annual draft where teams select eligible players to join the league.

Draft selections

Statistics 

Note: Italics indicates countries and clubs that no longer exist.

Draft selections by club

Draft selections by country

{{tb2|1|width=10|text-size=95|text=

See also 
 List of Serbian NBA players
 List of Serbian WNBA players
 List of foreign NBA drafted players

Notes
Details

Trades involving draft picks and rights

References

National Basketball Association draft
National Basketball Association lists
Lists of basketball players in Serbia